Silvia Meseguer Bellido (born 12 March 1989) is a Spanish football midfielder who plays for Atlético Madrid.

Club career
She previously played for Prainsa Zaragoza and Espanyol.

International career
She is a member of the Spanish national team, having made her debut in a 2–2 draw with England in October 2008. In June 2013 national team coach Ignacio Quereda selected Meseguer in the squad for UEFA Women's Euro 2013 in Sweden. She played every minute of Spain's campaign, which ended with a 3–1 defeat to Norway in the quarter-finals.

Silvia was part of Spain's squad for the 2015 FIFA Women's World Cup in Canada.

Official international goals
 2011 World Cup qualification
 1 in Malta 0–13 Spain
 2013 Euro qualification
 1 in Kazakhstan 0–4 Spain
 1 in Spain 3–2 Scotland
 Friendly match
 1 in China 1–3 Spain (2015)

Honours

Club
 RCD Espanyol
 Copa de la Reina de Fútbol: Winner 2009, 2010, 2012

 Atlético Madrid
 Primera División: Winner 2016–17, 2017–18
 Copa de la Reina de Fútbol: Winner 2016

Spain
 Algarve Cup: Winner 2017

References

External links
 
 
 

1989 births
Living people
People from Alcañiz
Sportspeople from the Province of Teruel
Spanish women's footballers
Footballers from Aragon
Spain women's international footballers
Primera División (women) players
RCD Espanyol Femenino players
Atlético Madrid Femenino players
Women's association football midfielders
2015 FIFA Women's World Cup players
Zaragoza CFF players
2019 FIFA Women's World Cup players
UEFA Women's Euro 2017 players
Spain women's youth international footballers
21st-century Spanish women